Les héros sont fatigués (released in the UK as The Heroes Are Tired) is a 1955 French-West German drama film directed by Yves Ciampi. For his performance Curt Jürgens was awarded the Volpi Cup for Best Actor at the 16th Venice International Film Festival.

Plot 

In a country in Africa, a former French fighter pilot (Yves Montand) who became a bush pilot realises that he is smuggling a significant quantity of diamonds. He decides to sell them for his own benefit. Meanwhile the diamond owner gets a former German fighter pilot (Curt Jürgens) to recover them. The two men become friends when they discover that they fought in the same place. They drink together and relive the good times of the war where they were heroes.

Cast 
Yves Montand as Michel Rivière 
Curt Jürgens as Wolf Gerke
María Félix as Manuella
Jean Servais as François Séverin
Elisabeth Manet as  Nina
Gert Fröbe as  Hermann
Hans Verner as  Olsen
Manolo Montez as  Pépé
Rudy Castell as  Rudi
Gordon Heath as  Sidney
Gérard Oury as  Villeterre
Harry-Max as  Harry-Max

References

External links

1955 films
1950s adventure drama films
French adventure drama films
Films directed by Yves Ciampi
Films set in Africa
1955 drama films
German adventure drama films
French black-and-white films
German black-and-white films
1950s French films
1950s German films
1950s French-language films
French-language German films